Leafwing may refer to:

Charaxinae, a subfamily of butterflies commonly known as the leafwings
Doleschallia bisaltide, a butterfly commonly known as the leafwing (in Australia) or autumnleaf (elsewhere)
Zaretis itys, a butterfly commonly known as the leaf wing

Animal common name disambiguation pages